The women's 3000 metres steeplechase event at the 2009 European Athletics U23 Championships was held in Kaunas, Lithuania, at S. Dariaus ir S. Girėno stadionas (Darius and Girėnas Stadium) on 19 July.

Medalists

Results

Final
19 July

Participation
According to an unofficial count, 14 athletes from 10 countries participated in the event.

 (2)
 (2)
 (2)
 (1)
 (1)
 (1)
 (1)
 (2)
 (1)
 (1)

References

3000 metres steeplechasechase
Steeplechase at the European Athletics U23 Championships